Alberta Children's Hospital (ACH) is the largest public hospital for sick children in the prairie provinces, and is located in Calgary, Alberta, Canada. It is operated by Alberta Health Services – Calgary Health Region. The new facility opened on September 27, 2006, and is the first free-standing pediatric facility to be built in Canada in more than 20 years. It was originally opened on May 19, 1922, as the Junior Red Cross Children's Hospital.   It is located west of the University of Calgary campus grounds and just across from the site of the Foothills Medical Centre.

ACH is one of several children's hospitals in Canada (others being Hospital for Sick Children in Toronto, Shriners Hospital for Children – Canada in Montreal, Stollery Children's Hospital in Edmonton, Centre Hospitalier Universitaire Sainte-Justine in Montréal, Children's Hospital of Eastern Ontario in Ottawa, McMaster Children's Hospital in Hamilton, The Children's Hospital of Winnipeg in Winnipeg, Children's Hospital at London Health Sciences Centre in London, Ontario, BC Children's Hospital in Vancouver and IWK Health Centre in Halifax).

Design
The Alberta Children's Hospital was designed with substantial input from young patients, as well as families, physicians and staff of the hospital. In 2002, architects created renderings of how the hospital could look; a multi-storey brick building. These drawings were brought to the hospital's Teen Advisory Group (TAG) and changed substantially into a colourful building closely resembling toy building blocks.

The idea for the Alberta Children's Hospital was to create a building that would reduce stress and promote healing. The interior of the hospital has been designed to enable the delivery of family centred care. The hospital includes supports for families.

The Alberta Children's Hospital is used by patients from birth to age 18 from southern Alberta, southeastern British Columbia and southwestern Saskatchewan. It is an accredited pediatric level I trauma centre by the Trauma Association of Canada. Additionally, the ACH is the provincial expert and referral centre for bone marrow transplantation, and is the leader in Western Canada (which is rapidly establishing itself as the national leader), for pediatric neurosciences. It also is the only pediatric hospital in Canada that consists of a comprehensive Behavioral Unit, is the world leader in congenital cataracts surgery, and has the largest pediatric vision clinic in all of Western Canada.

The Alberta Children's Hospital Research Institute for Child and Maternal Health (ACHRI) is the Alberta Children's Hospital's affiliated research institute, and has a team of over 150 involved in the study of human development from embryo to adulthood.

Clinics
The facility operates 34 clinics:
Asthma Clinic
Burns Clinic
Cardiology Clinic
Cystic Fibrosis Clinic
Dental Clinic
Developmental Clinic
Down Syndrome Clinic
Diabetes Clinic
Endocrine Clinic
Eye Clinic
Feeding Consultation Service
Gastro-Intestinal Clinic
Genetics Clinic
Haematology Clinic
Haemophilia Clinic
Infectious Disease Clinic
Inherited Metabolic Disorders
Myelomeningcele Clinic
Nephrology and Urology Clinic
Neurology Clinic
Neuromotor Clinic
Neuromuscular Clinic
Neuropsychological Service
Neuroscience Services
Neurosurgery Clinic
Orthopaedic Clinic
Perinatal Clinic
Plastics Clinic
Pulmonary Clinic
Refractory Epilepsy Clinic
Regional School Health
Respiratory Home Care Clinic
Rheumatology Clinic
Sleep Service Clinic
Vascular Malformation Clinic

See also
Health care in Calgary
Health care in Canada
Libin Cardiovascular Institute of Alberta
List of hospitals in Canada

References

Hospital buildings completed in 1922
1922 establishments in Alberta
Certified airports in Alberta
Children's hospitals in Canada
Heliports in Canada
Hospitals established in 1922
Hospitals in Calgary